Sutton Bridge railway station was a station in Sutton Bridge, south Lincolnshire, England, which opened in the 19th century. It became part of the Midland and Great Northern Joint Railway network, and served as a junction where the line from Great Yarmouth split into two sections one heading for Wisbech and Peterborough and the other for Spalding. The station closed with the line in 1959.

References

Disused railway stations in Lincolnshire
Former Midland and Great Northern Joint Railway stations
Railway stations in Great Britain opened in 1866
Railway stations in Great Britain closed in 1959
1866 establishments in England
1959 disestablishments in England